Dr. I.Q. (aka Dr. I.Q., the Mental Banker and Doctor I.Q.) is a radio and television quiz program that ran from 1939 – 1959.

Background
A "trial run" of Dr. I.Q. was staged at the Fox Theatre in Atlanta, Georgia, to test whether the program's format might be viable for radio. Allen C. Anthony, the program's announcer, said in 1961, "Overflow crowds at the Fox convinced producers that the Dr. I.Q. Show would go. When the 'I have a lady in the balcony, doctor' caught on, we knew we had it."

Radio
Over decades, the program's sponsors were Mars Candy, the Vick Chemical Company and Embassy Cigarettes. The radio series did not have a set studio. Instead, it traveled from city to city and broadcast from large concert halls and theaters. 

The quizmaster, Dr. I.Q., delivered silver dollars to audience members who correctly answered his fast-paced questions. The series began April 10, 1939, on the Blue Network with singer-announcer Lew Valentine as Dr. I.Q. Later quizmasters in the role of Dr. I.Q. were Jimmy McClain and Stanley Vainrib. The radio version aired until November 29, 1950 on the NBC and ABC networks. Valentine and McClain were also the hosts of Dr. I.Q. Jr., a juvenile version heard on NBC from 1941 to 1949.

Television
The television version ran on ABC from November 4, 1953, to October 17, 1954, and again from December 15, 1958 to March 23, 1959. The first host was Jay Owen. However, beginning January 18, 1954, McClain began hosting again. Tom Kennedy hosted the 1958–59 version. 

On January 18, 1954, Hazel Bishop cosmetics became a sponsor of the program.

Episode status
Only one episode is known to exist of the 1953-54 version, and it is with McClain as host. Four episodes exist with Kennedy (including a probable pilot taped on October 15, 1958) along with a pilot for a television version of Dr. I.Q. Jr.

References

Sources
I Have a Lady in the Balcony: Memoirs of a Broadcaster in Radio and Television

External links

A public domain TV episode of Dr. I.Q. at the Internet Archive

American radio game shows
1930s American radio programs
1940s American radio programs
1930s American game shows
1940s American game shows
1950s American game shows
1953 American television series debuts
1954 American television series endings
1958 American television series debuts
1959 American television series endings
Black-and-white American television shows
English-language television shows
American Broadcasting Company original programming
ABC radio programs
NBC radio programs